is a former Japanese football player and manager and currently first-team coach of J2 League club Júbilo Iwata for 2023.

Playing career
Miura was born in Shizuoka on August 12, 1970. After graduating from University of Tsukuba, he joined Yokohama Marinos in 1993. He played many matches as offensive midfielder and forward from first season. The club won the champions 1995 J1 League. However his opportunity to play decreased in 1998 and he moved to Kyoto Purple Sanga in 1999. In October 1999, he moved to Júbilo Iwata and the club won the champions 1999 J1 League. In 2001, he moved to FC Tokyo. He played many matches as defensive midfielder. The club won the champions 2004 J.League Cup first major title in the club history. However his opportunity to play decreased from 2005 and he retired end of 2006 season.

Coaching career
After retirement, Miura started coaching career at FC Tokyo in 2007. From 2009, he coached at Yokohama F. Marinos (2009–12), Albirex Niigata (2013-14) and Avispa Fukuoka (2015). In 2016, he signed with J3 League club AC Nagano Parceiro and became a manager. He managed the club and finished at 3rd place in 2016 season. In 2017, he moved to J1 League club Albirex Niigata. Although he managed in 10 games, the club won only one game. He was sacked in May 2017 when the club was at 17th place of 18 clubs. In 2018, he signed with J2 League club Fagiano Okayama and served as assistant coach under manager Tetsu Nagasawa. In 2019, he moved to J3 club SC Sagamihara and became a manager.

Club statistics

Managerial statistics
Update; December 31, 2018

References

External links
 
 
  

1970 births
Living people
University of Tsukuba alumni
Association football people from Shizuoka Prefecture
Japanese footballers
J1 League players
Yokohama F. Marinos players
Kyoto Sanga FC players
Júbilo Iwata players
FC Tokyo players
Japanese football managers
J1 League managers
J2 League managers
J3 League managers
AC Nagano Parceiro managers
Albirex Niigata managers
SC Sagamihara managers
Association football midfielders